Home Is Where My Feet Are is a 2002 album by Holly McNarland. Former Matthew Good Band guitarist Dave Genn appears on the album and is credited with two of the album's songs. "Beautiful Blue" was released as a single and was one of the top 100 most played songs on radio in Canada in 2002.

Track listing
"Do You Get High?" (McNarland, Genn)
"Sister" (McNarland)
"Beautiful Blue" (McNarland)
"When You Come Down" (McNarland)
"Brush into My Tears" (McNarland)
"I Cry" (McNarland)
"Voices" (McNarland)
"The Ride" (McNarland)
"Dallas" (McNarland)
"Watching Over You" (McNarland, McEwan)
"Losing My Face" (McNarland, Genn)
"More" (McNarland)

Year-end charts

References

2002 albums
Holly McNarland albums
Albums produced by Malcolm Burn
Albums produced by Warne Livesey